James Bradfield (1933–1989) was an Australian politician.

James Bradfield may also refer to:

 James Dean Bradfield (born 1969), Welsh musician, lead guitarist of the Manic Street Preachers
 James Bradfield Primary School, Norfolk, England
 James Bradfield Moody (born 1976), Australian business executive

See also
Bradfield (surname)